Carla Rhodes is an American wildlife conservation photographer. Formerly a ventriloquist, comedian and musician, Carla was mentored by Shari Lewis as a teenager.

Wildlife Conservation Photography

Carla Rhodes is a wildlife conservation photographer who tells engaging and impactful photographic stories featuring the natural world. She especially gravitates towards photographing misunderstood subjects, such as endangered Greater Adjutant storks and overlooked “common” species, who are no less fabulous than their exotic counterparts. 

Formerly a ventriloquist, Carla brings a plethora of unique skills to her photographic projects. Photographing with passion and a sense of humor, her work has been published in The New York Times, Smithsonian, National Wildlife, Audubon, and The Guardian. 

Ultimately, she aspires for her photographs to evoke emotion, educate viewers and inspire positive change.

Ventriloquism

Rhodes taught herself ventriloquism at the age of 9 after seeing Shari Lewis and Lamb Chop on television.  She began performing professionally at the age of 13 in a local (Louisville, Kentucky) magic shop. By the age of 15, she was performing regularly at the local comedy club.

In 2009, New York Magazine named Rhodes as one of the "Ten New Comedians That Funny People Find Funny."

She adds a new twist to the old art of ventriloquism. Rhodes' main squeeze is a cantankerous 1920s gentleman named Cecil Sinclaire.

Music

While attending college in Tennessee, Rhodes recorded a full-length comedy music album in Nashville.  "I Love Animals," a track from Carla's Golden Hits, vol 6, was played on the Dr. Demento's "Top Funny Five," eventually placing at number two.

Television

References

External links
 Official website
 Link to Dr. Demento Show featuring Carla Rhodes

1982 births
21st-century American comedians
Living people
Musicians from New York City
Musicians from Louisville, Kentucky
Ventriloquists
Kentucky women musicians
21st-century American women